The University and College Rugby League (UCRL), formerly known as the Student Rugby League, is the organisation which administrates university and college rugby league football in the United Kingdom, on behalf of the Rugby Football League and British Universities and Colleges Sport (BUCS).

Rugby league in universities has been an important vehicle for expansion of the game as players from outside the heartlands often first began to play at university level. Many continue to play after leaving university and this has led to the creation of teams in non-traditional areas such as London Skolars and the University of Gloucestershire All Golds.

Yorkshire Universities and Colleges played against Lancashire at Halifax's then ground The Shay, Halifax in 1976. The Yorkshire side was selected by Fred Lindop, coach and professional referee and included a number of players from Airedale & Wharfedale College.  22 - 0 down at half time the Yorkshire side fought back to tie the match at 22 - 22.

History

Founded in 1967 when a team was created at Leeds University by Andrew Cudbertson, Jack Abernathy and Cec Thompson, other teams soon joined in areas of the United Kingdom which lay outside of the games traditional heartlands. The first university game was between Leeds and Liverpool in 1968. A year later the Universities and Colleges Rugby League was formed after student pioneers fought hard to get the sport recognised in higher education. Portsmouth and Swansea were early non-traditional areas to accept the game.

Rugby League reached Oxford University in 1976 and the first Varsity fixture against Cambridge University took place in 1981. The varsity match has 'discretionary full blue' status.

Student Rugby League reached Scotland in 1989 when a group of students at Aberdeen University established a team and formed the first Scotland Students squad

The Pioneers were formed in 2005 and made their inaugural tour that year to Estonia. In the following years, development tours visited the Czech Republic, Latvia, Ukraine, Norway, Kazakhstan, Greece, Poland, Morocco and in 2014, to Ghana.

By 2006, the Student Rugby League had over 70 member clubs playing in 9 leagues, club locations ranging from Napier in Scotland to Exeter in the South West of England.

The elite Premier North & South competition was formed as the Super 6 in 2008.

In 2014, the Student Rugby League was renamed the University and College Rugby League (UCRL).

Student Rugby League Pyramid

 Premier North & Premier South
 Northern 1, 2A & 2B; Midlands 1 & 2; South East 1; Western 1 & 2
 HE Merit League

The Premier North & South competition is the elite student league. 
Five matches from the 2011 Super 8 including the inaugural Grand Final were televised live and free-to-view on Premier Sports. The BUCS Competition is split into nine playing leagues with the Premier North and the Premier South being supported by seven regional leagues. The fixtures run from October until March leading up to the Championship play-off series.

The U19's College Competition is split into three leagues, the North West, Yorkshire and the Premier Division. The College leagues play from September until March culminating in a top four play-off series. The Carnegie Champion Colleges is the knock-out competition for the Further Education sector.

Alongside SRL competitions, the top university sides can qualify for the Challenge Cup.

Past winners

Representative teams

In England, a series of regional games take place which lead to a North and South team being selected to play the University Rugby League Origin Game, from which the England team is selected.

Wales, Scotland and Ireland run national teams.

All four teams take part in the 4 Nations Championships that take place annually and the Tertiary Student Rugby League World Cup every four years. England also take part in the RFL President's Cup.

Previoualy a Great Britain and Ireland Academic Lions squad has been selected but this has been mothballed since 2014.

The 'GB Pioneers' are a representative team that undertake rugby league development tours to emerging nations.

See also
Tertiary Student Rugby League World Cup
Rugby league in England
Rugby league in Scotland
Rugby league in Wales
British Amateur Rugby League Association
British Universities and Colleges Sport
Rugby League Varsity Match

External links
 Student Rugby League
 Great Britain Student Rugby League 'The Pioneers'
 Oxford University Rugby League Football Club
 Brunel University Barbarians RLFC

References

Rugby league
University and college rugby league
Rugby league governing bodies in Europe
Sports organizations established in 1967